Father Sebastian Englert OFM Cap., (November 17, 1888 – January 8, 1969) was a Capuchin Franciscan friar, Roman Catholic priest, missionary, linguist and ethnologist from Germany. He is known for his pioneering work on Easter Island, where the Father Sebastian Englert Anthropological Museum is named after him.

Early life in Bavaria
Born Anton Franz Englert in Dillingen, Bavaria, Father Sebastian spent his school days in Eichstätt and Burghausen.

In 1907, he entered the novitiate of the Order of Friars Minor Capuchin and received the religious name Sebastian. He undertook his canonical studies in philosophy and theology in the Capuchin studium of Dillingen, and was ordained to the priesthood in 1912.

During the First World War, Father Sebastian served as a chaplain in the German Army in France and Belgium, and after the war he worked for five years as a parish priest in the  Schwabing district of Munich. In 1922, he went at his own request as a missionary to the Mapuche at Villarrica and Pucón in Southern Chile.

Missionary and scientific activity in Chile

Father Sebastian served in the Apostolic Vicariate of the Araucanía in Villarrica and Pucón, which at the time was administered almost entirely by Capuchins. There, in addition to his pastoral duties, he conducted ethnological and linguistic research into Mapuche culture and the  Mapudungun language. From 1934 to 1938, he published studies in Araucanian literature, ethnology and folklore. During this period, his linguistic studies included an investigation of the relationship of Quechua and Aymara to the Mapuche language.

Rapa Nui

From 1935 for more than 30 years until his death, Father Sebastian worked as a missionary priest on Rapa Nui (Easter Island). At the time, he was perhaps the only non-Rapa Nui to have mastered their language. Although he celebrated Mass in Latin, he preached, heard confessions and catechized the faithful in the Rapa Nui language. He also translated popular Catholic devotions into Rapa Nui and encouraged native religious song. In 1964, he produced a history of the early activity of the French Sacred Hearts missionaries who first evangelized the island.

Given the isolation of Rapa Nui during the period before air travel, Father Sebastian researched the language, ethnology and anthropology of Easter Island. His knowledge of Rapa Nui culture and prehistory impressed the scientific staff of the Norwegian Archaeological Expedition of 1955. William Mulloy, a member of that expedition, writes: In 1963, Fr. Sebastian was awarded the Bundesverdienstkreuz (Federal Cross of Merit) First Class by the Federal Republic of Germany. He died in New Orleans, Louisiana in 1969 during a lecture tour of the United States. His remains were returned to Rapa Nui and interred in the cemetery in the Tahai district, but were later transferred to the site of Holy Cross Church in Hanga Roa.

In his will, he left all his books, his writings and his collection of native artifacts to the Government of Chile with the intention of forming a museum, but it wasn't until 1994 that the Father Sebastian Englert Anthropological Museum (MAPSE) was opened under the Chilean Directorate of Libraries, Archives and Museums (DiBAM).  His papers, along with those of other researchers in Rapanui culture, are in the Biblioteca William Mulloy, which is administered by MAPSE.

Publications

 Englert, S. 2004. La tierra de Hotu Matu'a: historia y etnología de la Isla de Pascua: gramática y diccionario del antiguo idioma de Isla de Pascua. 9th ed. Santiago de Chile: Editorial Universitaria.
 Englert, S. 1980. Leyendas de Isla de Pascua: textos bilingües. Santiago de Chile: Ediciones de la Universidad de Chile.
 Englert, S. 1978. Idioma rapanui: gramática y diccionario del antiguo idioma de la Isla de Pascua. Santiago de Chile: Universidad de Chile.
 Englert, S. 1977. Diccionario Rapanui-Español. New York: AMS Press.
 Englert, S. 1970. Island at the Center of the World; New Light on Easter Island. Translated and edited by William Mulloy. New York: Scribner.
 Englert, S. 1964. Primer siglo cristiano de la Isla de Pascua, 1864-1964. Villarrica, Chile: Escuela Lito-Tipográfica Salesiana “La Gratitud Nacional”.
 Englert, S. 1938. Diccionario Rapanui-Español redactado en la Isla de Pascua, por p. Sebastián Englert, Mis. Cap. Santiago de Chile: Prensas de la Universidad de Chile.
 Englert, S., and M. Buschkühl. 1988. Missionsgeschichte der Osterinsel: Pater Sebastian Englert O.F.M.Cap. (1888-1969) zum 100. Geburtstag. Ausstellung, Dezember 1988-März 1989. Eichstätt: Universitätsbibliothek.

References

Further reading

 Heyerdahl, T. 1960. Aku-Aku: The Secret of Easter Island. Cardinal Giant edn. New York: Pocket Books.
 Mulloy, W.T. 1969. "Sebastian Englert 1888-1969." American Anthropologist 71:1109-11.
 Heyerdahl, T;  E.N. Ferdon, W.T. Mulloy, A. Skjølsvold, C.S. Smith. 1961. Norwegian Archaeological Expedition to Easter Island and the East Pacific. Archaeology of Easter Island. Stockholm; Santa Fe, N.M.: Forum Pub. House; distributed by The School of American Research.

External links
 Father Sebastian Englert Anthropology Museum of Rapa Nui
 William Mulloy Library
 Order of Friars Minor Capuchin in Chile

1888 births
1969 deaths
People from Dillingen an der Donau
German Roman Catholic missionaries
Roman Catholic missionaries in Easter Island
Capuchin missionaries
Officers Crosses of the Order of Merit of the Federal Republic of Germany
German expatriates in Ecuador
Roman Catholic missionaries in Ecuador
German expatriates in Chile
Researchers in Rapa Nui archaeology
Missionary linguists
Linguists of Rapa Nui